The Sirețel is a left tributary of the river Siret in Romania. It flows into the Siret near Dumbrava.

References

Rivers of Romania
Rivers of Iași County